National State Bank is located in Camden, Camden County, New Jersey, United States. The building was built in 1813 and was added to the National Register of Historic Places on August 24, 1990.

In February 2017 the building became home to  "City Invincible" an architecture, urban design and tech start-up firm after extensive renovation.

See also
 1913 in architecture
 National Register of Historic Places listings in Camden County, New Jersey

References

1913 establishments in New Jersey
Bank buildings on the National Register of Historic Places in New Jersey
Commercial buildings completed in 1913
Buildings and structures in Camden, New Jersey
Neoclassical architecture in New Jersey
National Register of Historic Places in Camden County, New Jersey
New Jersey Register of Historic Places